The Sweden women's national football team has represented Sweden at the FIFA Women's World Cup on eight occasions in 1991, 1995, 1999, 2003, 2007,2011, 2015 and 2019.  There were runners up once and three times bronze medalists: in 1991, in 2011 and in 2019

1991 World Cup 

For the World Cup women qualified for the European Championship 1991. But they had prevailed first in the group stage with four wins against France and Poland. In the quarter-final against Italy they reached in the home game only a 1-1. However, due to the 0-0 draw in the second leg, Italy were qualified for the European Championship finals by the away goals rule. As the other teams eliminated in the quarter-finals did not win and everyone lost at least one, Sweden was the fifth European team to qualify for the World Cup.

In the People's Republic of China, Sweden also qualified alongside Brazil, United States and Japan. On November 17, 1991, Sweden played in Panyu District their first World Cup match and lost to the USA with 2: 3. It Lena Videkull scored the first World Cup goal for the Swedes with the 1: 3.

In the second game then followed a 8-0 against Japan, with Videkull after 30 seconds, the 1-0 and thus the fastest goal in a women's World Cup succeeded. With a 2-0 win over Brazil in their last group game, Sweden became second in the group and scored in the quarter-finals on the team of hosts and China. Already in the 3rd minute Pia Sundhage managed the 1: 0, where it remained until the end. In the semifinals then Norway was the opponent. Although Sweden were back early, this time in the sixth minute of the lead in the lead, but had to accept just before the half-time break the compensation by a converted penalty and pay tribute in the second half of the superiority of the Norwegians, who moved through three more goals in the final. In the match for third place was then for the first time European champion Germany the opponent and with the 4: 0 the Swedes secured third place.

Group B

Quarter-finals

Semi-finals

Third place play-off

1995 World Cup 

Four years later, the Swedes did not have to qualify as World Cup hosts, making Sweden the first country to host both the men's (1958) and women's World Cups. Nevertheless, they participated in the Qualification as it also served as a qualification for the Euro 1995. With four wins against the Slovakia and Latvia, they made it into the quarter-finals. Denmark was defeated 3-0 in the home game after a 2-0 away defeat. So they would have been athletically qualified for the World Cup. In the semi-final, they lost the away game against Norway with 3: 4, but won the home game with 4: 1. In the final in Germany against the defending champion they lost with 2: 3.

At the World Cup in their own country, Tomas Brolin and Kristin Bengtsson (Player of the Year and Player of the Year 1994 in Sweden) earned them four years previously Brazil and Japan zugelost, also EM Final opponents Germany. After a 1-0 defeat against Brazil, they were able to retaliate with 3: 2 against Germany for the European Championship final defeat. With a 2: 0 against Japan, they were tied with Germany group second, as they had the worse goal difference. In the quarter-final against China, they fell in the 29th Minute 0-1 in arrears and it remained until the 90th Minute. In the third minute of added time, Ulrika Kalte still managed to equalize. Since no team could score a goal in the subsequent extra time, there was the first penalty shootout at a women's World Cup. Here, the Chinese had the slightly better goal scorers and came through a 4: 3 in the semifinals. China then lost in the semi-final against Germany and also the small final against the USA. The Swedes, who were awarded the  Fair Play Prize, had to watch their neighbor Norway win the final against Germany and become the first European team to win Women's World Cup. However, after qualifying for the quarter-finals, Sweden qualified for the women's first football tournament at the Olympic Games, in which only the eight best teams from the World Cup could participate.  Weil, however England was the seventh best team in the Olympic Games not eligible to start, Brazil could participate as the ninth best team also.

Group A

Quarter-finals

1999 World Cup 

For the third World Cup, UEFA then set up separate qualifiers for the first time and to date the only continental association. In the Qualification Sweden met the Ukraine, Iceland and Spain. With six wins in six games Sweden took first place with nine points ahead of Ukraine and qualified directly for the World Cup. Ukraine then lost in the play-offs of the runners-up against Germany, which thus also qualified.

In the US, the Swedes lost the opening match against China with 1: 2, with a 3-1 draw against  Australia and a 2: 0 against World Cup newcomer Ghana but was still ranked second. In the quarterfinals they met the neighbors and defending champion Norway. After a scoreless first half, they lost 1: 3, which the World Cup was back in the quarterfinals. However, Sweden was qualified for the Women's Football Tournament at the Olympic Games 2000, which is hosted by only the seven best teams from the World Cup in addition to the hosts Australia could.

Group D

Quarter-finals

2003 World Cup 

Actually, the 2003 World Cup should take place again in People's Republic of China. Due to the SARS epidemic, the tournament was temporarily relocated to the United States. Thus the World Cup took place for the second time in the USA. In the Qualification, Sweden met Denmark, Switzerland and neighbors Finland. With five wins and one defeat Sweden qualified as group winners for the World Cup. The second placed and tied Danes did not manage to qualify for the World Cup in the playoffs of the runners-up. After a 0-2 in France that was 1-1 in the home game too little.

In the USA, they met in the first group match on the host USA and lost with 1: 3. Against North Korea then followed a 1-0 win and a 3-0 victory over Nigeria reached the quarter-finals as second in the group. Here Brazil was the opponent and after a 2-1 the semi-final was reached. In this they also won against Canada 2-1 and reached the final for the first time. Here Germany was the opponent who had turned off the host and defending champion in the semifinals. After the first 40 minutes were scoreless Hanna Ljungberg scored in the 42nd minute 1-0 for the Swedes, which it went to the break. Immediately after a push back to the second half, Maren Meinert equalized. It remained until the end of regular time, so that there was an extension as four years earlier. In this Nia Kuenzer the only Golden goal in a women's World Cup game with which the German women for the first time world champion and Germany became the first world champion in men and women. For Sweden, second place is still the best finish to date and Sweden was also qualified for the Women's Football Tournament at the Olympic Games 2004, which hosted Greece only the two best European teams of the World Cup could participate.

Group A

Quarter-finals

Semi-finals

Final

2007 World Cup

At the finals, they met  USA,  Nigeria and North Korea. In the opening match against Nigeria, it was enough only to a 1-1. In the second game against the USA, they lost 0-2. So they had to win in the last game against North Korea with three goals difference to reach the quarter-finals. But it only succeeded in a 2-1 victory with Sweden first time in the preliminary round eliminated. In the preliminaries, Sweden also failed to qualify for the women's football tournament at the 2008 Olympic Games, which was only attended by the three best European teams from the World Cup. As England was not allowed to start as the third best European team, Sweden and Denmark were allowed to play for this place. Sweden prevailed with 4: 2 and 3: 1 and then could participate.

Group B

The four teams were also paired in the same group in 2003.

2011 World Cup 

For the World Cup in Germany 2011 FIFA Women's World Cup qualification, the Swedes with seven wins and a draw against the Czech Republic, Belgium, Wales and Azerbaijan. The Swedes scored with 17: 0 against Azerbaijan their highest international victory. With the 1-0 victory in the Czech Republic on the penultimate round Sweden secured the ticket for the play-off round of the group winners, this time was necessary. The first leg against Denmark was won 2: 1, as it was 1: 2 in the second leg after 90 minutes. In this secured Charlotte Rohlin, who had already scored the 1: 2-goal, with the goal to 2: 2 the World Cup ticket.

In Germany Sweden was dissolved into a group with the US and North Korea, as it had been four years earlier. A new addition was Colombia, which had qualified for the World Cup for the first time and Sweden beat the opening 1-0 win. After another 1: 0 against North Korea, the Swedes and the Americans were already qualified for the quarter-finals. In the direct comparison, it was only about who was group winner and thus vice-world champion Brazil went out of the way. The Swedes were able to win a World Cup match against the USA for the first time with a score of 2: 1 in the quarter-finals Australia, which surprisingly eliminated Norway. With 3: 1, the Swedes prevailed against the Asian champions and reached the semi-finals. Here they met the surprise team Japan, which had eliminated hosts and two-times defending champions Germany in the quarterfinals. Sweden took the lead in the 10th minute through Josefine Öqvist, but had to accept the equalizer eight minutes later. It remained until the half-time break. In the second half, the Japanese could then shoot two more goals, while the attack efforts of the Swedes were unsuccessful. Japan was thus the first time in the final and was by a victory against the USA in the penalty shootout as the first Asian team football world champion. Sweden won the small final against France the day before with a remarkable goal by Marie Hammarström even though she lost 22 minutes to Öqvist after Red Card. With the semi-final draw Sweden could also qualify for the Women's Football Tournament at the Olympic Games, in which only the two best European teams of the World Cup and United Kingdom could participate as hosts.

Group C

Quarter-finals

Semi-finals

Third place play-off

2015 World Cup 

In the Qualification the Swedes prevail again. In the group were Scotland, Poland, Bosnia-Herzegovina, Northern Ireland and for the first time the Faroe Islands the opponents. After nine wins, Sweden and Scotland had at least reached the playoff games of the best runners-up. On the last day of the match, the Swedes won 2-0 against the Scottish side and were thus the last of the seven group winners to qualify directly for the World Cup finals. The Scots failed in the playoffs to the Netherlands, who qualified for the World Cup for the first time.

In the draw for the groups, the Swedes were not placed and were "tied" to Group D with  USA, against whom they had to play four times in the preliminary round. Further group opponents are Australia  and Nigeria. The group was considered the most balanced of the World Cup; it was the only one with four teams that at least reached the semi-finals in their last continental championship fights.

Sweden took the lead in their first game against Nigeria with two goals, twice exploiting the inexperience of Africans in corners. Nigeria could still turn the game and in the end, the Swedes had to be satisfied with the 3: 3. After a 0-0 draw against the USA in the fifth meeting at a World Cup and a 1-1 draw against Australia, the Swedes reached as fourth-best group third in the second round. Here they lost with 1: 4 against Germany and retired. This meant that Sweden, the only European team to have participated in all past Olympic women's football tournaments, had also missed the direct qualification for the women's football tournament at the Olympic Games, but still had the chance to win the third European Olympic ticket in playoffs against the three other European knockout round losers. This was achieved in March 2016 when they were group first in the same playoff.

Group D

Round of 16

2019 World Cup 
After the quarter-finals at European Championship 2017 Pia Sundhage had given up the post of national coach, followed by Peter Gerhardsson. In addition, record goalscorer Lotta Schelin could no longer be used due to a neck injury sustained in June 2017, ultimately prompting her to end her career in August 2018.

Qualifying opponents became Denmark, the Ukraine, Hungary and Croatia. The Swedes started with a 2-0 victory in Croatia and then had to play for the first home game against Denmark, as the Danish association canceled the game because the Danish players did not want to compete because of disagreements with the association. UEFA finally scored the game 3-0 for Sweden.

The next three games won the Swedes with just one goal, but then lost in Ukraine with 0: 1, and thus for the first time against an Eastern European team. Although they then won the second leg against the Ukrainians, but by the defeat in the first leg, it was the last game in Denmark: with a draw or a victory, Sweden would qualify directly for the World Cup finals, in a defeat, the Danes would first time Since 2007, the finals have been reached again and Sweden should be in the playoffs of the best runners-up for the last European starting place. A goal from Sofia Jakobsson immediately after the half-time break gave Sweden a 1-0 win and qualified for the finals in France.

In France, for the first time Chile and Thailand and for the sixth time in the preliminary round, the USA were the group opponents. The Swedes started with a 2-0 victory against Chile, but had to wait until the 83rd minute for the first goal. The first goal came quicker in the 5-1 victory against Thailand, which was already achieved in the 6th minute. Even faster, they came into the backlog against the US in the third minute. The last goal of the 0-2 defeat then fell through a Jonna Andersson deflected shot. As second in the group, the Swedes met Canada and reached the quarter-final against Germany by a 1-0 victory. After 24 years without a competitive victory against Germany succeeded with a 2-1 to 0-1 deficit to the semi-finals against European champions Netherlands. In the semifinals the Swedes lost 1-0 after extra time. Sweden got a bronze medal after defeating England 2-1.

Group F

Round of 16

Quarter-finals

Semi-finals

Third place play-off

2023 World Cup

Group G

FIFA World Cup record

Goalscorers 

 Own goals scored for opponents
 Jonna Andersson (scored for United States in 2019)

References 

 
World Cup
Countries at the FIFA Women's World Cup